The 1910 population census in Bosnia and Herzegovina was the fourth census of the population of Bosnia and Herzegovina taken during the Austro-Hungarian Condominium of Bosnia and Herzegovina

Results 
The number of inhabitants: 1,898,044
Population density: 37.1 per km²

Overall

References 

Censuses in Bosnia and Herzegovina
1910 in Bosnia and Herzegovina
Austro-Hungarian rule in Bosnia and Herzegovina
Bosnia